La Selva de Fuego (The Jungle of Fire) is a 1945 Mexican romantic drama film directed by Fernando de Fuentes and starring Dolores del Río.

Plot summary
The movie develops into the Jungle of Chiapas in México. A beautiful woman named Estrella (Dolores del Río) lost in a savage zone of the jungle. She is found by a group of men who are being held into the jungle as social outcasts. Their leader, Luciano (Arturo de Córdova) is a man of integrity, but with an inexplicable hatred toward women. The presence of a sensual woman between several alone men causing a chaos that only Luciano can save.

Curiosities
According to María Félix in her autobiography (Todas mis Guerras México, 1993), cause of this movie, she and Dolores del Río mistook their paths for only time. The film was written by Félix, but the messenger sent by mistake the film for Dolores. María finished filming the movie Vértigo (written by Dolores).

References

External links 

1945 films
Mexican black-and-white films
1945 romantic drama films
1940s Spanish-language films
Mexican romantic drama films
1940s Mexican films